The 1973 All-Ireland Minor Football Championship was the 42nd staging of the All-Ireland Minor Football Championship, the Gaelic Athletic Association's premier inter-county Gaelic football tournament for boys under the age of 18.

Cork entered the championship as defending champions, however, they were defeated by Tyrone.

On 23 September 1973, Tyrone won the championship following a 2-11 to 1-6 defeat of Kildare in the All-Ireland final. This was their third All-Ireland title overall and their first in 25 championship seasons.

Results

Connacht Minor Football Championship

Quarter-Final

Galway 1-10 Sligo 1-6 Tubbercurry. 

Semi-Finals

Mayo 2-10 Leitrim 0-2 Carrick-on-Shannon.

Galway 1-12 Roscommon 1-6 Castlebar. 

Finals

'Home'

Mayo 3-7 Galway 0-3 Tuam.

'England'

Mayo 2-14 Herefordshire 0-2 Castlebar.

Munster Minor Football Championship

Ulster Minor Football Championship

Leinster Minor Football Championship

All-Ireland Minor Football Championship

Semi-Finals

Mayo 0-9 Kildare 0-8 Croke Park.

Final

Championship statistics

Miscellaneous

 Kildare win the Leinster Championship for the first time in their history. They also qualify for their first and only All-Ireland final appearance.

References

1973
All-Ireland Minor Football Championship